Legionella thermalis is a bacterium from the genus Legionella which has been isolated from water from a hot spring in Tokyo on Japan.

References

Legionellales
Bacteria described in 2016